Lore is a name. Notable people with the name include:

Given name
 Lore Agnes (1876–1953), German politician
 Lore Bader (1888–1973), American baseball pitcher
 Lore Berger (1921–1943), Swiss writer
 Lore Fischer (1911–1991), German alto and concert singer
 Lore Frisch (1925–1962), German actress
 Lore Lorentz (1920–1994), German cabaret artist and standup comedian
 Lore Noto (1923–2002), American theatre producer
 Lore Alford Rogers (1875–1975), American bacteriologist and dairy scientist
 Lore Segal (born 1928), American novelist, translator, teacher, and author
 Lore Trittner (born 8 July 1933), Austrian swimmer

Surname
 Charles B. Lore (1831–1911), American lawyer and politician from Delaware
 Marc Lore, American businessman and entrepreneur
 Nicholas Lore (born 1944), American social scientist
 William Lore (1909–2012), Lieutenant Commander in the Royal Canadian Navy